Knut Hergel (27 November 1899 – 2 September 1982) was a Norwegian actor and theatre director.

Hergel was actor at Stavanger Theater from 1924 to 1926, and at the theatre in Trondheim from 1926 to 1927. He was employed as stage producer at Det Nye Teater (Oslo) from 1928 to 1935. He was instructor at Det Norske Teatret from 1935, and theatre director from 1936 to 1946, except for the war period. As a refugee in Sweden from 1942 to 1945, he worked as an instructor at the Malmö City Theatre. He was theatre director at the National Theatre from 1946 to 1960, and later instructor at the same theatre.

References

1899 births
1982 deaths
Norwegian male stage actors
Norwegian theatre directors